Arriva Southern Counties is a bus operator in Surrey, West Sussex, East Sussex, Kent, Essex, Hemel Hempstead, and Watford in England. It is a subsidiary of Arriva UK Bus.

History
 

In November 1986, the National Bus Company sold Maidstone & District in a management buyout to Einkorn Limited. In June 1988, New Enterprise Coaches of Tonbridge was purchased, followed in December 1991 by four buses and their associated Kent County Council services from Shearings, and in June 1992 Boro'line Maidstone.

In 1990, British Bus purchased the Cranleigh, Guildford and Woking based operations of Alder Valley followed in 1993 by Colchester Borough Transport and Southend Transport.

In April 1995, Einkorn was sold to British Bus, which had purchased Kentish Bus in July 1994 and Londonlinks in 1988. In August 1995, Einkorn was renamed Invictaway. Invictaway was previously the name of the Maidstone & District commuter services to London, which were renamed Green Line at the same time.

In July 1996, British Bus was taken over by the Cowie Group. Invictaway was renamed Arriva Southern Counties in April 1998, and Arriva transferred London & Country (also owned by British Bus) to it. The subsidiary operating companies therefore became:

Maidstone & District:
Mainly became Arriva Kent & Sussex
Medway area became Arriva Medway Towns
Kentish Bus:
Mainly became Arriva Kent Thameside
Partly became Arriva Kent & Sussex
London & Country:
Became Arriva Guildford & West Surrey
LondonLinks:
Became Arriva Croydon & North Surrey

Current operations in the South East area are:
Arriva Guildford & West Surrey
Arriva Kent & Sussex
Arriva Kent Thameside
Arriva Medway Towns
Arriva Southend

Many reorganisations of Arriva operations in South East England have followed since and today the company also controls Arriva Guildford & West Surrey, Arriva West Sussex, and Arriva Southend. The Croydon & North Surrey subsidiary was largely transferred to Arriva London.

In 2001, the Crawley depot and operations were sold to Metrobus and the depot in Merstham was closed.

In August 2004, Arriva Colchester was sold to Tellings-Golden Miller, although with the December 2007, sale of Tellings-Golden Miller, Colchester is once again owned by Arriva, albeit not under the control of Arriva Southern Counties. In October 2009, the Horsham depot and routes were sold to Metrobus with 19 buses.

In March 2015, Network Colchester and Network Harlow operations were taken over from Tellings-Golden Miller, who at the time was an Arriva subsidiary. Both operation companies were rebranded Arriva Colchester and Arriva Harlow respectively.

The Medway Towns network was upgraded in a £10 million investment marketed as Operation Overdrive.

In April 2021, Arriva announced the Sheerness depot would close in July 2021, with routes 360, 361 and 367 being withdrawn and re-tendered by Kent County Council. All three routes transferred to Chalkwell Coaches on Monday 12 July 2021.

In October 2021, Arriva announced that routes 306 and 308 from Northfleet depot would be withdrawn. These services were taken over by Redroute Buses on 1 November 2021.

In October 2021, Arriva announced it was planning to close the Guildford depot and cease operations in Surrey from 18 December 2021. From that date, 6 routes will be taken over by Stagecoach South, with routes 36/37 being replaced by a new route 6 and an extension to the existing Route 1. Route A was withdrawn without replacement from 14 November 2021. The depot was leased to Stagecoach South.

Services

Local and Interurban Services

Arriva Southern Counties operate a mixture of local and interurban services across Kent and Essex, although operations in Colchester and Southend-on-Sea are localised to each town.

In Southend, Arriva Southern Counties operate a local network of services covering Rayleigh, Hadleigh, Rochford and Shoeburyness and in Colchester, they operate a number of local services around the town.

In Kent, operations from the company's depots in Northfleet, Gillingham, Maidstone and Tunbridge Wells combine to create a network across the northern and western areas of the county. Services are centred in the towns of Dartford, Gravesend, Chatham, Maidstone, Tonbridge and Tunbridge Wells and also extend to Tenterden, Hawkhurst, Sevenoaks, Orpington, Sittingbourne and Sheerness-on-Sea.

The company also operates a small number of branded interurban services.

Sapphire routes 480/490

Arriva Southern Counties currently operate Sapphire branded buses in Kent Thameside on routes 480 and 490 which link Dartford and Bluewater with Greenhithe, Swanscombe, Northfleet, Gravesend and Valley Drive. These services are operated using a fleet of Wright Streetlite buses fitted with free WiFi, e-leather seats and USB charging ports.

Sapphire branded buses were also previously used on routes 101 and 700 in the Medway Towns but has since been discontinued on these services.

Southend route 9
Arriva Southern Counties operate branded buses on route 9 in Southend which operates between Rayleigh and Shoeburyness. The Optare Versa buses that operate this service are branded as "We're heading to the beach".

Park & Ride

Colchester
Arriva Southern Counties currently operate the Colchester park & ride service under contract to Essex County Council. The service operates in a loop between the Park & Ride site next to the A12, Colchester City Centre and Colchester Station.

Maidstone

Until February 2022, Arriva Southern Counties operated the Maidstone park & ride under contract to Maidstone Borough Council. The service linked Maidstone Town Centre with two park & ride sites, one on London Road and one on Willington Street. The service was withdrawn in February 2022 due to reduced passenger numbers as a result of the COVID-19 pandemic.

Fastrack

Arriva Southern Counties operate the Fastrack busway scheme in the Thames Gateway area of Kent on behalf of Kent County Council, Prologis and Amazon.

Arriva Southern Counties currently operate the following three Fastrack services:
 Route A runs from Dartford to Bluewater via Temple Hill, The Bridge and 
 Route AZ runs from the Amazon LCY3 distribution centre to either Dartford or Gravesend at shift changeover times only
 Route B runs from Temple Hill to Gravesend via Dartford, Darent Valley Hospital, Bluewater, Greenhithe and Ebbsfleet Valley

Since November 2007, Route B has connected with the Eurostar at Ebbsfleet International railway station, and Eurostar passengers are permitted free travel on the service.

On 11 February 2008, Arriva began trialling their mobile "m-ticket" system on the Fastrack Network before rolling the system out on all Southern Counties services.

Depots

Current Depots
The locations of Arriva Southern Counties' depots and the divisions which operate them are:

Former Depots
Former depots of Arriva Southern Counties were:

Dartford and Grays garages were the only Arriva Southern Counties depots which did not have commercial services and only handled services operated under contract to Transport for London with all buses painted in red Arriva livery.

Commercial routes previously operated from Dartford depot before it became an all Transport for London depot were transferred to Northfleet. Grays depot switched to all Transport for London services after Arriva Southend withdrew both commercial routes 373 and 383 in the Grays area, partially replacing them by extending route 5 from Southend-on-Sea. Routes 44 and 150, the remaining services in the Grays area, are operated under contract to Thurrock Council. The buses used for these routes were transferred to Southend.

As at September 2014, Dartford garage operated London routes 160, 428, 492, B12, B13 and B15. Grays garage operated London routes 66, 346, 370, 375 and 499.

As part of a decision to consolidate all of Arriva's Transport for London routes, Dartford and Grays garages transferred to Arriva London on 1 January 2016.

Fleet
As at December 2013 the fleet consisted of 900 buses and coaches. As at September 2014, 113 buses were dedicated to the Transport for London services.

References

External links

Company website

1986 establishments in England
Southern Counties
British companies established in 1986
Bus operators in Kent
Transport companies established in 1986
Transport in Kent
Transport in Southend-on-Sea
Transport in Surrey
Transport in Thurrock